This is a list of the number-one singles of the Polish Airplay Chart.

List of number-one singles

See also
 Polish music charts
 ZPAV
 List of number-one dance singles in Poland
 List of number-one albums in Poland

Polish record charts